Borgo San Siro (Western Lombard: Bùrgh San Sir) is a comune (municipality) in the Province of Pavia in the Italian region Lombardy, located about  southwest of Milan and about  northwest of Pavia, in the western Lomellina.

Borgo San Siro borders the following municipalities: Bereguardo, Gambolò, Garlasco, Tromello, Vigevano, Zerbolò.

References

Cities and towns in Lombardy